The Singapore Herald was a tabloid newspaper in Singapore whose publishing license was suspended by the Singapore government on 28 May 1971. The government had accused the paper of being involved in "black operations", of being funded by questionable foreign sources, of working up agitation against national policies and institutions, and of "taking on the government".

In 1974, the government strengthened press control through the Newspaper and Printing Presses Act. Its editors included M.G.G. Pillai and Adele Koh, who later became a political figure in South Australia.

See also 
Censorship in Singapore
List of newspapers in Singapore

References

Sources 
 Seow, Francis T. 1998. The Media Enthralled: Singapore Revisited. Boulder: Lynne  Rienner. 

Newspapers published in Singapore